The Spanish Cybersecurity Research Conference  (Spanish: Jornadas Nacionales de Investigación en Ciberseguridad (JNIC)), is a scientific congress that works as a meeting point where different actors working in the field of cybersecurity research (universities, technological and research centres, companies and public authorities) can exchange knowledge and experience with the shared goal of strengthening research in the Cybersecurity field at the national level.

Goals 

The need to run these kind of conferences was identified during the drafting of the Summary report of the feasibility study and design of a network of centers of excellence in R&D in  cybersecurity,  with the consensus of participants.

The strategic plan of the Spanish Network of Excellence on Cybersecurity Research included on its measure #17, the creation of national cybsersecurity R&D+i conferences, intended to be the scientific meeting point in which both the Network of Excellence in particular and the research ecosystem in general could demonstrate their capacities, both in terms of knowledge and talent and in terms of research findings and their potential for transference to market.

Equally, the measure #12 of the same study, proposed the design of an open call for proposals with mechanisms to evaluate and select candidates in order to grant awards and acknowledgement for research excellence.

Organizers 

Each edition of the conferences is organised by the institution selected according to the procedure laid out in the regulation of the JNIC.

An organising committee is named based on the regulations established for the JNIC, with the General chair of the committee being the representative from the organising institution who is responsible for the event.

The Spanish National Cybersecurity Institute (INCIBE) in its mission to support research in cybersecurity for strengthening the cybersecurity sector, collaborates in the organization of this conference.

Technology Transfer Program 
With the aim of converting the JNIC into a scientific forum of excellence in national cybersecurity field that promotes the innovation, for the first time in the 2017 edition, a complete Technological Transfer Program has been designed, that was an instrument to bring final users (companies, organisms, etc.) in contact with researchers in order to solve cybersecurity problems that were unresolved, formulated as scientific challenges.

This initiative ran for several years until 2021 edition, helping to promote technology transfer.

Current edition 
 JNIC 2023, will be held in Vigo in June 2023 and organized by atlanTTic (University of Vigo) and Gradiant (foundation).

Past Editions 
 JNIC2015, held in León on 14, 15 and 16 September 2015 and organized by Universidad de León. 
 JNIC2016 held in Granada, on 15, 16 y 17 June 2016 and organized by Universidad de Granada. 
 JNIC2017, held in Madrid, on 31 May, 1 and 2 June 2017 and organized by Universidad Rey Juan Carlos.
 JNIC2018, held in San Sebastián, on 13, 14 and 15 June 2018 and organized by Universidad de Mondragón.
 JNIC2019, held in Cáceres, Spain, on 5, 6 and 6 June 2019 and organized by University of Extremadura, COMPUTAEX Foundation and Complutense University of Madrid.
 JNIC2020, postponed to 2021 as a result of the situation generated by the coronavirus pandemic (COVID-19).
 JNIC 2021 LIVE, held online on 9 and 10 of June 2021 and organized by University of Castilla–La Mancha.
 JNIC 2022, held in Bilbao, on 27, 28 and 29 June 2022 and organized by Tecnalia.

References 

Computer security
Computer science conferences
International conferences in Spain